Žirje is an island and a settlement in the Croatian part of the Adriatic Sea. Its area is 15.08 km2, and it has a population of 103 (2011 census). Its population is steadily decreasing (720 residents in 1953, 207 residents in 1981, and 124 residents in 2001).

The island is composed of two limestone ridges. Nestled between them is a fertile valley. The vegetation of the island is mainly composed of maquis shrubland, with some farm land in the central parts of the island. Main industries are agriculture (grapes, olives, plums, figs and sour cherries) and fishing. Fish is abundant in the waters around Žirje. Tourism on Žirje has remained largely undeveloped in comparison to the other islands in the Croatian Adriatic.

In the 12th and 13th centuries the island was defended by fortresses and walls constructed on the foundations of an earlier Byzantine fortress from the 6th century. Due to its use by the Yugoslav People's Army, the southern and south-western parts of the island were off limits to the islanders and visitors for nearly half a century.

The ferry port on the island provides a link to the county seat Šibenik via the D128 route.

References

Bibliography

External links 
 Žirje on infoadriatic.com
 Official pages of Island of Žirje

Islands of Croatia
Islands of the Adriatic Sea
Populated places in Šibenik-Knin County
Landforms of Šibenik-Knin County